Sijekovac is a village in the municipality of Brod, Bosnia and Herzegovina. It is the location of Sijekovac killings that occurred before the beginning of the Bosnian War.

References

Villages in Republika Srpska
Populated places in Brod, Bosnia and Herzegovina